E621 may refer to:

E621, the E number for Monosodium glutamate
E621, a E6 Series Shinkansen locomotive car
FS Class E.621, an Italian locomotive class
e621, a booru-style imageboard focusing on the furry fandom, owned by Bad Dragon